Dr. Rafil A. Dhafir is an American Iraqi-born physician, who was sentenced on October 28, 2005, to 22 years in prison for violating the Iraqi sanctions by sending money to Iraq through his charity program Help the Needy, as well as fraud, money laundering, tax evasion, and a variety of other crimes. Five other people, including his wife, had already pleaded guilty to charges in connection with the case.

Following his arrest, in February 2003, both Attorney General John Ashcroft and New York State Governor Pataki characterized Dhafir as a "suspected terrorist," a claim the federal government did not pursue.

An appeal was filed to the United States Court of Appeals for the Second Circuit. Oral arguments were presented on August 28, 2008. Ruling almost a year later, on August 18, 2009, the court of appeals upheld Dr. Dhafir's convictions but vacated his sentence and remanded to the district court for resentencing.

Dhafir was released on May 15, 2020.

References

Living people
Iraqi emigrants to the United States
20th-century Iraqi physicians
Year of birth missing (living people)